Dimitri Peters (born 4 May 1984 in Gljaden, Russian SFSR, Soviet Union) is a German judoka.

At the 2012 Summer Olympics, he lost to gold medallist Tagir Khaibulaev at the semi-final stage, and then won through the repechage, beating Ramziddin Sayidov in his bronze medal match.

Achievements

References

External links
 
 
 
 
 

1984 births
Living people
German male judoka
Judoka at the 2012 Summer Olympics
Olympic judoka of Germany
German people of Russian descent
Olympic medalists in judo
Olympic bronze medalists for Germany
Medalists at the 2012 Summer Olympics
European Games competitors for Germany
Judoka at the 2015 European Games
20th-century German people
21st-century German people